Brano Likić (born 23 January 1954, in Sarajevo, Bosnia and Herzegovina, Yugoslavia) is a composer, producer, and performer.

He founded the band Rezonansa. Likić's studio, BLAP, was where most of the music from Sarajevo in the 1980s and 1990s was recorded.

See also
Music of Bosnia and Herzegovina

References

External links
 Rezonansa.com
 Official website

Musicians from Sarajevo
1954 births
Living people
Bosnia and Herzegovina composers
Bosnia and Herzegovina record producers